Lymphocyte antigen 96, also known as "Myeloid Differentiation factor 2 (MD-2)," is a protein that in humans is encoded by the LY96 gene.

The protein encoded by this gene is involved in binding lipopolysaccharide with Toll-Like Receptor (TLR4).

Function 

The MD-2 protein appears to associate with toll-like receptor 4 on the cell surface and confers responsiveness to lipopolysaccharide (LPS), thus providing a link between the receptor and LPS signaling. That is, the primary interface between TLR4 and MD-2 is formed before binding LPS and the dimerization interface is induced by binding LPS.

Structure 
MD-2 has a β-cup fold structure composed of two anti-parallel β sheets forming a large hydrophobic pocket for ligand binding.

Interactions 

Lymphocyte antigen 96 has been shown to interact with TLR 4.

When LPS binds to a hydrophobic pocket in MD-2, it directly mediates dimerization of the two TLR4-MD-2 complexes. Thus, MD-2 form a heterodimer that recognizes a common pattern in structurally diverse LPS molecules. These interactions allow TLR4 to recognize LPS. Macrophages in MD-2 knockout mice are unresponsive to LPS. 

LPS is extracted from the bacterial membrane and transferred to TLR4-MD-2 by two accessory proteins, LPS-binding protein and CD14, to induce innate immune response.

References

Further reading

External links